Benjamin "Benik" Egishevitch Markarian was an Armenian astrophysicist. Markarian's Chain is a group of galaxies which was named after him when he discovered that its members move with a common motion. He is also the namesake of a catalog of compact, optically bright galaxies (including both starbursts and active galactic nuclei) known as Markarian galaxies.

External links
 Beniamin Markarian at ARAS.am

1913 births
1985 deaths
People from Marneuli
People from Tiflis Governorate
Armenian astrophysicists
Armenian academics
Soviet astrophysicists